The Kindelfließ is a small river that flows through Brandenburg, to the east of Glienicke/Nordbahn into Berlin, where, just over the border, it meets with the Tegeler Fließ.

Rivers of Berlin
Rivers of Brandenburg
Rivers of Germany